Ramen Teh, also known as Ramen Shop (or in Japanese, 家族のレシピ, Kazoku no Recipe, Family Recipe), is a Singaporean-Japanese-French film. The film is directed by Eric Khoo, and stars Takumi Saito, Jeanette Aw, Seiko Matsuda, Mark Lee, Tsuyoshi Ihara, Tetsuya Bessho, and Beatrice Chien.

Ramen Teh had its world premiere at the Berlin International Film Festival in February 2018 and was released in Singapore on 29 March 2018.

Premise
Masato is a young ramen chef in the city of Takasaki in Japan. After the sudden death of his emotionally distant father, he chances upon a suitcase of memorabilia and a red notebook – filled with musings and old photos – left behind by his Singaporean mother who died when he was just ten years old. Acting on a hunch, he takes off for Singapore with the notebook, hoping to piece together the story of his life, as well as that of his parents. There he meets Miki, a Japanese food blogger and single mother who helps him track down his maternal uncle Ah Wee, who runs a bak kut teh stall. Masato discovers that his grandmother Madam Lee is still alive, and that she holds the key to the tender yet turbulent love story of his parents. Masato and his grandmother try to heal each other’s broken souls, and find salvation in the kitchen where the meals they cook become more than the sum of their ingredients.

Cast
 Takumi Saito as Masato
 Jeanette Aw as Mei Lian
 Seiko Matsuda as Miki
 Mark Lee as Uncle Wee
 Tsuyoshi Ihara as Kazuo
 Tetsuya Bessho as Uncle Akio
 Beatrice Chien as Madam Lee

Production

Filming
Principal photography began in July 2017, in Singapore. Several recurring scenes were filmed in the Jigen-in Temple, located at the summit of Mt. Kannonyama in Takasaki, Japan, featuring the majestic Takasaki Byakue Dai-Kannon.

Japanese chef Keisuke Takeda and Singapore food blogger Dr Leslie Tay were tapped to consult on the culinary scenes in the film.

Release
The film premiered as the closing film of the Culinary Cinema section at the Berlin International Film Festival on 23 February 2018.

Reception

Box office 
In limited reporting, Ramen Teh grossed $26,149 in Colombia, $9,384 in Czech Republic, $472,940 in France and $72,984 in Spain.

Critical response
The site's critical consensus reads, "On a filmmaking level, Ramen Shop may not be quite as rich and flavorful as the cuisine it celebrates, but it's still a largely satisfying -- and hunger-inducing -- experience." Maggie Lee of Variety stated that "derivative aspects aside, this simple and direct celebration of Singapore’s culinary heritage goes down easy". Allan Hunter of Screen International wrote in his review, "Khoo's gentle drama may be too slight and sentimental for some tastes but it is handled with a sincerity that could commend it to incurable romantics and insatiable foodies alike".

References

External links
 
 Official Site

2018 films
2010s Japanese-language films
Singaporean drama films
Japanese drama films
French drama films
Singaporean multilingual films
Japanese multilingual films
French multilingual films
2010s English-language films
2010s Mandarin-language films
English-language Singaporean films
English-language Japanese films
2010s Japanese films
2010s French films